is a Japanese politician and the former governor of Mie Prefecture located in Kansai region of Japan. Since 2021 he is a Member of the House of Representatives, representing Mie's 4th district.

References 

1964 births
Living people
Politicians from Hyōgo Prefecture
University of Tokyo alumni
Governors of Mie Prefecture
Members of the House of Representatives (Japan)